Year 210 (CCX) was a common year starting on Monday (link will display the full calendar) of the Julian calendar. At the time, it was known as the Year of the Consulship of Faustinus and Rufinus (or, less frequently, year 963 Ab urbe condita). The denomination 210 for this year has been used since the early medieval period, when the Anno Domini calendar era became the prevalent method in Europe for naming years.

Events 
 By place 

 Roman Empire 
 Having suffered heavy losses since invading Scotland in 208, Emperor Septimius Severus sends his son - Caracalla - to systematically wipe out and torture the Scots into submission.

Births 
 May 10 – Claudius II, Roman emperor (d. 270)
 Dexippus, Greek historian and general (d. 273)
 Egnatius Lucillianus, Roman governor (d. 244)
 Ruan Ji, Chinese musician and poet (d. 263)

Deaths 
 Cao Chun, Chinese general and adviser (b. 170)
 Liu Hong, Chinese astronomer and politician (b. 129)
 Sextus Empiricus, Greek philosopher and writer
 Zhou Yu, Chinese general and strategist (b. 175)

References